The IPTN N-2130 was a proposed 80-130 passenger commuter airliner of original design by IPTN (now Indonesian Aerospace). The N-2130 was estimated to cost two billion US dollars. The project was cancelled in 1998 due to the Asian financial crisis.

The aircraft has similarities with the Boeing 737 and Airbus A318.

Variants
 N2130-80 - 80 seater Regional Jet
 N2130-100 - 104 seat Regional Jet
 N2130-130 - 132 seat Regional Jet

Specifications

References

External links
 Angkasa N0.2 November 1999 Tahun X, Nasib N2130 Kian Menggantung
 PT-IPTN N-2130 Departemen Perindustrian
 N2130 Regional Jet
 IPTN focuses on higher capacity for N2130 regional family
 Jet setting: Following its N250 turboprop, IPTN has started work on an 80- to 130-seat regional jet
  Video N2130 from YouTube

N-2130
Abandoned civil aircraft projects
Twinjets
Low-wing aircraft